Dower's Prairie is a  native prairie remnant located in southwest Wisconsin, United States. Originally a dairy cow pasture, a hunter in 1989 discovered that it was home to an abundance of rare plant species. After being fenced off from cattle, the parcel of land owned by dairy farmer Steve Dower has grown and diversified with over 150 different species.

Dower's Prairie includes prairie bush-clover (federally threatened), rattlesnake master, prairie blazing star, compass plant, showy goldenrod, coneflower, big bluestem, little bluestem, indiangrass, side oates grama, pale purple coneflower, and aster.

Dower's Prairie is periodically burned and maintained by Steve Hubner. Hubner sometimes leads tours of the area, though it is not open to the public.

References

Sources
Dowers Prairie, Through the Seasons.  S Hubner. 2013. 
http://www.manta.com/c/mmf5fcd/steve-dower
https://web.archive.org/web/20140313223456/http://www.theprairieenthusiasts.org/chapter/pbluff/pbluff.htm
https://web.archive.org/web/20140313223447/http://www.theprairieenthusiasts.org/newsletters/PPspring2010.pdf
http://www.theprairieenthusiasts.org/
https://www.scribd.com/book/340242603/Dower-s-Prairie-through-the-Seasons

Geography of Wisconsin
Prairies